Winslow Township may refer to the following places:

 Winslow Township, Washington County, Arkansas
 Winslow Township, Stephenson County, Illinois
 Winslow Township, Camden County, New Jersey
 Winslow Township, Jefferson County, Pennsylvania

See also
 Winslow (disambiguation)

Township name disambiguation pages